Cumanayagua is a municipality and town in the Cienfuegos Province of Cuba.

History

Cumanayagua was inhabited by Cuban Taíno indigenous people when the Spanish arrived to the island. Though the meaning of the name is uncertain, is known it comes from Taino Arawak origin. Some scholars believe it means "The place filled with flowers of Royal Palms" other believe it could mean "The place of Cuma and Anayagua", Cuma was the aboriginal chief ruler of the region, and Anayagua his daughter and heir to the chiefdom.

The village was established by Spanish and Cuban creole under Colonial times with a longer name and the village was officially established as a town on 3 May 1804, under the name of San Felipe de Cumanayagua.  This name was retained until 1878 when it was changed into "Santa Cruz de Cumanayagua", and finally at the turn of the 20th century got its definitive and shorter Taino name it has today.

Geography
Located in the south-eastern corner of the province, by the Caribbean Coast and at the borders with the province of Villa Clara and Sancti Spíritus; the municipal territory includes part of Escambray Mountain Range and the nature reserves of Topes de Collantes and Pico San Juan. The town lies in south of Avilés Reservoir and is crossed by the Hanabanilla River.

The municipality borders with the ones of Cienfuegos, Palmira, Cruces, Manicaragua and Trinidad. It counts several hamlets (villages and localities), as Arimao, Barajagua, Camilo Cienfuegos, Entronque de Minas, Gavillán, Guajimico, Hoyo de Padilla, La Clara, La Sierrita, Las Moscas, Playa El Inglés, Playa Yaguanabo, San Blas, San Francisco and San Juan.

Demographics

In 2004, the municipality of Cumanayagua had a population of 51,435.

Economy
Citrus fruits and coffee are grown in the municipality of Cumanayagua.

See also
Municipalities of Cuba
List of cities in Cuba

References

External links

Cities in Cuba
Populated places in Cienfuegos Province
Populated places established in 1976
1976 establishments in Cuba